Parupeneus heptacanthus, commonly known as cinnabar goatfish, and sold in UK as "Red Mullet", is a marine fish native to the western Pacific and Indian Oceans.

Parasites
As in other fish, the cinnabar goatfish has many parasites, including the physalopterid nematode Rasheedia heptacanthi, a parasite of its digestive system.

References

External links
 

Fish of Thailand
Fish described in 1802
Fish of the Pacific Ocean
Fish of the Indian Ocean
heptacanthus